Ak (also Romanized as Āq; also known as Ak Kharaghan Sharghi) is a village in Kharaqan-e Sharqi Rural District, Abgarm District, Avaj County, Qazvin Province, Iran. At the 2006 census, its population was 73, in 24 families.

References 

Populated places in Avaj County